Betta rutilans is a species of gourami endemic to Indonesia. Their habitat is blackwater streams and peat swamp forests with very little sunlight. Their name rutilans is Latin for "reddish", "grow red", or "being red".

Description
They typically grow up to  TL in length. Like their name implies, they are typically solid red with males of the species being more intensely colored, but a few rarely have green side. Males have more-so pointed dorsal fins and longer pelvic fins. Females are generally rounder and have an egg tube. They will consume insects and small invertebrate.

Reproduction
Like most Betta fish, they breed in bubble-nests built to house the fry. Strangely enough, some have been seen to mouthbrood. The cause of this difference is unknown.

Captivity
This species has been collected for use in aquariums for their intense color. They can be housed in community tanks with proper hiding spots in place and tank adequately sized for the amount of fish and species. They are from blackwater environments and should be housed in warm water with filtering.

References

rutilans
Taxa named by Kai-Erik Witte
Taxa named by Maurice Kottelat
Fish described in 1991
Fish of Indonesia